The 2011–12 international cricket season was from October 2011 to April 2012 and included a number of Test, One Day International and Twenty20 International series. The season saw the launch of the ICC T20I Championship in October 2011. England, the reigning ICC World Twenty20 champions, were ranked number one. England had their first defences of the ICC Test Championship number-one ranking they acquired at home in August 2011. While they retained the spot throughout the season, they showed their weaknesses in Asian conditions as they were whitewashed in a three-Test series against Pakistan. Australia were the best ranked in the ICC ODI Championship throughout the season but their rating dropped from 130 to 123 after average performances in the season. They would drop to number four in the following season.

Season overview

Pre-season rankings

 Note: Zimbabwe are currently unranked in Tests as they have played insufficient matches. They have 106 points and a rating of 53.

October

West Indies in Bangladesh

Afghanistan in the UAE

Australia in South Africa

England in India

New Zealand in Zimbabwe

Sri Lanka vs Pakistan in United Arab Emirates

November

West Indies in India

Pakistan in Bangladesh

December

New Zealand in Australia

Sri Lanka in South Africa

India in Australia

January

England vs Pakistan in United Arab Emirates

Zimbabwe in New Zealand

February

Commonwealth Bank Series

Afghanistan against Pakistan in UAE

Ireland in Kenya

South Africa in New Zealand

India women in West Indies

World Cricket League Division Five

Group stage

Final Placings

March

Asia Cup

ICC World Twenty20 Qualifier

Final Placings

Australia in West Indies

England in Sri Lanka

Afghanistan vs Netherlands in United Arab Emirates

India in South Africa

References

External links
2011/12 season in ESPN CricInfo

2011 in cricket
2012 in cricket